Hostage (Persian title: Gerogan - )  is a 1974 Iranian Persian-genre drama Romantic film directed by Ahmad Shirazi and starring Afrouz, Reza Beyk Imanverdi, Morteza Aghili, Shanaz Tehrani, Ali Azad, Nematollah Gorji, and Ali Miri .

Cast 

 Reza Beik Imanverdi
 Morteza Aghili 
 Ali Azad
 Shahnaz Tehrani
 Afrouz
 Ali Miri
 Nemnatollah Gorji
 Siamak Atlasi

References

Films about hostage takings
1970s crime action films
1974 films
1970s Persian-language films
Iranian romance films
Romantic action films
Iranian black-and-white films